New Zealand–Sweden relations refers to the bilateral relationship between New Zealand and Sweden.

Diplomatic relations

New Zealand opened an embassy in Stockholm during 2008 which was closed on 1 July 2012 following a change of government, however, New Zealand re-opened its embassy in Stockholm in 2018, in the chancery of the British Embassy. 

Sweden had an embassy in Wellington which closed down in 1995, and is now accredited to New Zealand from its embassy in Canberra, Australia.

The political relations as of 2013 were considered good. In addition to both being members of various multinational organisations and groups, the New Zealand and Swedish Governments cooperate through the Friends of Fossil Fuel Subsidy Reform and Global Research Alliance on Agricultural Greenhouse Gases. A working holiday scheme between the two countries has also been in place since 2001.

Migration

During the 1870s, the New Zealand government used agents to recruit migrants from across Scandinavia. As of 1881, there were 1,264 Swedish-born people living in New Zealand, and this number expanded to 1,548 in 1901 before decreasing considerably over subsequent decades. Since 2001 there has been modest growth in the number of Swedes moving to New Zealand, with 1,353 people reporting being born in Sweden in the 2013 New Zealand Census. A further 1,401 New Zealanders recorded that they had Swedish ancestry. There are two Swedish associations in New Zealand: Svenska Föreningen Nya Zeeland, which is located in Auckland, and the Sweden-New Zealand Association Inc in Wellington.

As of 2001, 687 New Zealand-born people were residents of Sweden. There is a social club for New Zealanders living in Sweden, as well as two combined clubs for Australians and New Zealanders in the country.

Trade

In 2014, the total value of international trade between New Zealand and Sweden was $NZ358 million. Of this, $NZ62 million was exports from New Zealand to Sweden, with the remainder being exports from Sweden to New Zealand.

In 2016, the New Zealand Scandinavian Business Association promoted commercial links between the two countries. The joint Swedish Government-private sector organisation Business Sweden also covers New Zealand from its office in Sydney, Australia.

See also 
 Foreign relations of New Zealand
 Foreign relations of Sweden

References

 
Sweden
New Zealand